Grant McKenzie (born 11 May 1961) is a New Zealand cricketer. He played in 34 first-class and 11 List A matches for Northern Districts from 1983 to 1991.

See also
 List of Northern Districts representative cricketers

References

External links
 

1961 births
Living people
New Zealand cricketers
Northern Districts cricketers
Cricketers from Napier, New Zealand